V. Joseph is the name of:

 Valentine Joseph, Sri Lankan mathematician (1929–2017), noted for his contributions to education
 V. J. Sabu Joseph (born 1981), film editor
 V. J. Bella (born 1927), former member of the Louisiana House of Representatives
 V. Joseph Thomas (1941–2018), former Director General of Kerala Police in India
 V. K. Joseph, Indian film critic